KHAN (99.5 FM) was a radio station licensed to Chugwater, Wyoming, United States. The station was owned by Victor Michael Jr. and Van Michael through licensee Michael Radio Group.

History
The station was assigned the call letters KCUG on March 23, 2005. The station subsequently went through a series of call sign changes: on April 5, 2006, the station changed its call sign to KWHO; on September 12, 2006, back to KCUG; on September 30, 2008, to KMJY; on July 19, 2010, to KAAZ; on April 6, 2011, to KRQU; on November 22, 2012, to KWYJ; and on June 21, 2013, to the current KHAN.

On August 27, 2014, the station's owners notified the Federal Communications Commission that the KHAN had been silent since June 13, 2013, and requested cancellation of KHAN's license.

References

External links

HAN
Radio stations established in 2005
Radio stations disestablished in 2014
2014 disestablishments in Wyoming
2005 establishments in Wyoming
Defunct radio stations in the United States
HAN